Pulchellodromus pardalis is a spider species found in Europe (Portugal, Spain) and North Africa (Algeria to Egypt).

See also 
 List of Philodromidae species

References

External links 

Philodromidae
Spiders described in 2007
Spiders of Europe
Spiders of North Africa
Fauna of Algeria
Arthropods of Egypt